David Lewis Hamilton (born September 29, 1997) is an American professional baseball shortstop and second baseman for the Boston Red Sox of Major League Baseball (MLB).

Career
Hamilton attended San Marcos High School in San Marcos, Texas. The Los Angeles Angels selected him in the 28th round of the 2016 MLB draft, but he did not sign with the Angels. He enrolled at the University of Texas at Austin, where he played college baseball for the Texas Longhorns. In 2018, he played collegiate summer baseball with the Yarmouth–Dennis Red Sox of the Cape Cod Baseball League. He tore his achilles tendon, causing him to miss his junior season in 2019.

Milwaukee Brewers
The Milwaukee Brewers selected Hamilton in the eighth round, with the 253rd overall selection, of the 2019 MLB draft. He signed with the Brewers, forgoing his senior season at Texas.

During the 2020 season, Hamilton played for Team Texas in Constellation Energy League, following the cancellation of the 2020 Minor League Baseball season due to the COVID-19 pandemic. In 2021, he played for the Wisconsin Timber Rattlers in High-A Central. He stole six bases in a game on June 2, setting a franchise record. In August, the Brewers promoted him to the Biloxi Shuckers of Double-A South.

Boston Red Sox
On December 1, 2021, the Brewers traded Hamilton, Jackie Bradley Jr., and Alex Binelas to the Boston Red Sox for Hunter Renfroe. In his first game with the Double-A Portland Sea Dogs, Hamilton went 5-for-7 with two home runs, seven RBIs, and a stolen base. In 2022 in the minor leagues he batted .251/.338/.402 in 463 at bats and was tied for third in the minor leagues in stolen bases, with 70, while being caught eight times. He was named the minor-league Baserunner of the Year by the Red Sox organization. 

On November 15, 2022, Hamilton was added to Boston's 40-man roster. Hamilton was optioned to the Triple-A Worcester Red Sox to begin the 2023 season.

References

Further reading

External links
Texas Longhorns biography

1997 births
Living people
Sportspeople from San Marcos, Texas
Baseball infielders
Texas Longhorns baseball players
Yarmouth–Dennis Red Sox players
Wisconsin Timber Rattlers players
Biloxi Shuckers players
Salt River Rafters players
Portland Sea Dogs players